Budka Suflera ("prompter's box") was a Polish rock band which was started in 1969 in Lublin by Krzysztof Cugowski. Although they disbanded soon after, Cugowski and Romuald Lipko reformed the band in 1974 and were active until 2014.

History

Early days (1969–1974) 
The band was started in 1969 with jam sessions by Krzysztof Cugowski (vocals), Krzysztof Brozi (lead guitar), Janusz Pędzisz (bass guitar) and Jacek Grün (drums). They performed cover versions of John Mayall, Jimi Hendrix and Led Zeppelin in local venues and disbanded after making a few radio recordings and several concerts.

In 1970 Cugowski joined a band Stowarzyszenie Cnót Wszelakich, led by his school mate Romuald Lipko. Soon the band was renamed to Budka Suflera. After few member changes the band finally made in March 1974 to be their first major recording, "Sen o dolinie" as the Polish cover of Bill Withers' "Ain't No Sunshine". The song received much airplay, which resulted in an offer from Polskie Nagrania record label, as well as numerous concert proposals.

Breakthrough (1975–1976) 
In autumn 1974, they recorded "Cień wielkiej góry", inspired by death of Polish mountaineers Zbigniew Stepek and Andrzej Grzązek in the Himalayas in 1973. It instantly became a hit and appeared on many compilations and live albums since then. The band also recorded "Lubię ten stary obraz" in November 1974 and "Memu miastu na do widzenia" in the beginning of 1975. The drummer Zbigniew Zieliński was replaced by Tomasz Zeliszewski soon after this.

The first album, titled Cień wielkiej góry after its first track, was released in 1975. This record saw some contributions from Czesław Niemen, who played his Moog synthesizer psychedelic parts in a majestic rock suite called "Szalony koń". Clocking over 19 minutes, this track took a whole B-side of the long play.

The radio hit "Sen o dolinie" as well as "Memu miastu na do widzenia" were not placed on the album. The first one was rejected by the record label, because it was a cover of a foreign artist and the latter was written by Lipko solely (there was a sort of deal among the band members, they wanted only songs written by Cugowski and Lipko together on the first album). However, the latter would make an appearance in a re-recorded version on the 1981 album Za ostatni grosz.

The release became a success and the band went on a tour to East Germany. There, German versions of a few of the band's greatest hits were recorded. There were plans to release an album in Germany, but they failed as Cugowski missed a recording session. A second attempt failed, too, because of the exhausting tour that ended just before.

In 1976 another band's record, named Przechodniem byłem między wami was released. It did not repeat the success of its predecessor. After the release, Cugowski decided to leave the band and start a solo career. He was replaced by Stanisław Wenglorz, an ex-singer of Skaldowie. He has only appeared on few records ("Rozmowa", "Kula nocnego światła", "Ślady na piasku", "Życiowy numer"), then unreleased and quit soon after. The next vocalist became Romuald Czystaw.

Members 
The band's line-up has changed many times over the years. Since 2005 the band members are:
 Krzysztof Cugowski – vocals
 Romuald Lipko – keyboards
 Tomasz Zeliszewski –  drums
 Łukasz Pilch – guitar
 Mirosław Stępień – bass guitar
 Piotr Kominek – keyboards
 Anna Patynek –  percussion
 Małgorzata Orczyk – backing vocals
 Irena Kijewska – backing vocals

Discography

Studio albums 
 Cień wielkiej góry (1975)
 Przechodniem byłem między wami (1976)
 Na brzegu światła (1979)
 Ona przyszła prosto z chmur (1980)
 Za ostatni grosz (1982)
 Czas czekania, czas olśnienia (1984)
 Giganci tańczą (1986)
 Ratujmy co się da (1988)
 Cisza (1993)
 Noc (1995)
 Nic nie boli, tak jak życie (1997)
 Bal wszystkich świętych (2000)
 Mokre oczy (2002)
 Jest (2004) POL #2
 Zawsze czegoś brak (2009) POL #19
10 lat samotności (2020)

Minialbums 
 American Tour (1987)
 4 Pieces to Go (1992)

Live albums 
 Budka w Operze, Live from Sopot '94 (1994)
 Akustycznie (1998)
 Live at Carnegie Hall (2000)

Compilation albums 
 1974–1984 (1984)
 The Best of Urszula & Budka Suflera (1988)
 Greatest Hits (1992)
 Underground (1993)
 Greatest Hits II (1999)
 Antologia 74-99 (1999)
 Budka Suflera dla tp.internet (2000)
 The Best Of (5 track CD) (2002)
 Palę sobie... (5 track CD) (2003)
 Posluchaj sobie (5 track CD) (2003)
 Leksykon Budki Suflera 1974–2005 (2006)
 Gwiazdy Polskiej muzyki lat 80: Budka Suflera (2007)

References 

Musical groups established in 1969
Polish rock music groups
Polish progressive rock groups